Southern Indian Ocean Fisheries Agreement (SIOFA) is an international fisheries agreement between several nations signed in Rome on 7 July 2006 and entered into force on 21 June 2012. The purpose of the agreement is to ensure and promote the long-term conservation and sustainable use of the fishery resources in the area through cooperation among the member states.

Treaty area
The agreement area covers the high seas between eastern Africa and Western Australia. SIOFA is adjacent to the convention area of the Commission for the Conservation of Antarctic Marine Living Resources (CCAMLR) in the south, the South Pacific Regional Fisheries Management Organisation (SPRFMO) convention area in the east and the South East Atlantic Fisheries Organisation (SEAFO) convention area to the west.

SIOFA covers fishery resources including fish, mollusks, crustaceans and other sedentary species within the area, though excludes highly migratory species and sedentary species subject to the fishery jurisdiction of coastal States. SIOFA also manages valuable fisheries, including for orange roughy, alfonsino and toothfish.

Signatories
As of July 2019, the treaty has been ratified by 10 states.  
In addition, 5 countries have signed but not ratified the treaty.

Secretariat
The Secretariat is based on the French Island of Réunion. The current Executive Secretary is Thierry Clot.

References

External links
SIOFA official website
FAO SIOFA summary

Fisheries treaties
Treaties of Australia
Treaties of the Cook Islands
Treaties entered into by the European Union
Treaties of France
Treaties of Japan
Treaties of South Korea
Treaties of Mauritius
Treaties of Seychelles
Treaties of the Comoros
Treaties of Kenya
Treaties of Madagascar
Treaties of Mozambique
Treaties of New Zealand
Organizations based in Réunion
International organizations based in France
Fisheries agencies